The Imperator-class ocean liners were a series of three ocean liners designed for the Hamburg America Line, commonly known as HAPAG. These three ships were commissioned by the chairman of HAPAG Albert Ballin. Vaterland is the largest passenger ship ever operated by a German shipping company.

Background
The Hamburg America Line was one of two German shipping companies which operated transatlantic crossings, the other being North German Lloyd. Lloyd soon had a fleet of four liners with weekly transatlantic crossings on offer. Though successful, the Deutschland could not rival the "Four Flyers" owned by Lloyd. HAPAG soon added the Kaiserin Auguste Viktoria to their fleet which was the largest ship in the world at its launch in August 1906. British competition was also fierce, Cunard's  launched in 1906 followed by her sister  were an instant success and by 1910, the new s of White Star were nearing completion.

References
 Mark A. Russell: Steamship Nationalism: Ocean Liners and National Identity in Imperial Germany and the Atlantic World. Routledge Studies in Modern European History, Routledge New York, NY, 2020. ISBN 978-0-367-13643-7.

External links
 
 

 
Ships of the Hamburg America Line
Ocean liner classes